Chito may refer to:

Chito Calvo (1903–1977), Filipino basketball player, swimmer, and coach
Chito Garcia (1924–2015), Mexican baseball outfielder and manager
Chito Gascon, Filipino lawyer, civil organizer, and human-rights activist
Chito Jaime (born 1983), Filipino professional basketball player
Chito Latamblé (1916–1993), Cuban tres player who specialized in the changüí genre of eastern Cuba
Chito Loyzaga (born 1958), Filipino former basketball player and basketball commissioner
Chito Martínez, (born 1965), the first player in the history of Major League Baseball to be born in the country of Belize
Chito Martínez (footballer) (born 1977), Venezuelan footballer
Chito Miranda (born 1976), Filipino singer-songwriter and lead singer for the band Parokya ni Edgar
Chito Narvasa (born 1956), Filipino business executive and former basketball player and coach
Chito S. Roño (born 1954), Filipino writer, producer, and director
Chito Salud (born 1962), Filipino lawyer and sports executive
Chito Soganub (1960–2020), Filipino Roman Catholic priest based in Marawi
Chito Tagle (born 1957), Filipino cardinal of the Catholic Church
Chito Victolero (born 1975), former Filipino professional basketball player and current coach

See also
Chito-ryu (千唐流), a style of karate founded by Dr. Tsuyoshi Chitose, (1898–1984)
Chito Branch Reserve, in southeastern Hillsborough County, Florida, US
Chitō Station, railway station formerly located in Chiebun (智恵文), Nayoro Hokkaidō, Japan
Cito (disambiguation)
Shetou
Shito
Tchito
Chi Tau